The Most Esteemed Family Order of Laila Utama is an order of Brunei. It was established on 1 March 1954 by Sultan Omar Ali Saifuddien III. The order carries the post-nominal letters "DK" as well as the title "Dato Laila Utama".

Recipients

D.K. 
 1954: Sultan Sir Omar Ali Saifuddien III, Sultan of Brunei
 1954: Pengiran Anak Damit binti Abdul Rahman
 1954: Sultan Hassanal Bolkiah, Sultan of Brunei
 1954: Prince Mohamed Bolkiah
 1967: Pengiran Anak Haji Mohammad Alam
 1968: Pengiran Haji Muhammad Yusuf
 1970: Prince Sufri Bolkiah
 1970: Prince Jefri Bolkiah
 1970: Princess Masna Bolkiah
 1970: Pengiran Anak Saleha, Raja Isteri of Brunei
 1972: Pengiran Anak Isteri Pengiran Anak Hajah Zariah
 1972: Pengiran Anak Hajah Besar
 1972: Pengiran Anak Haji Abdul Aziz
 2005: Sarah, Crown Princess of Brunei
 Pengiran Anak Isteri Pengiran Norhayati

 Haji Awang Isa

Honorary recipients

D.K. (K) 
 1957: Tuanku Abdul Rahman, Yang di-Pertuan Agong of Malaysia
 1958: Hisamuddin, Sultan of Selangor
 1958: Ismail, Sultan of Johor
 1959: Tunku Abdul Rahman, Prime Minister of Malaysia
 1960: Yusof Ishak, Yang di-Pertuan Negara of Singapore (later President)
 1961: Yahya Petra, Sultan of Kelantan
 1968: Tuanku Ja’afar, Yang di-Pertuan Besar of Negeri Sembilan
 1972: Elizabeth II, Queen of the United Kingdom
 1972: Prince Philip, Duke of Edinburgh
 1972: Peter Gautrey, British High Commissioner to Brunei
 1972: Iskandar, Sultan of Johor
 1980: Ahmad Shah, Sultan of Pahang
 1984: Noor, Queen Consort of Jordan
 1987: Zanariah, Raja Permaisuri Agong of Malaysia
 1988: Fidel V. Ramos, President of the Philippines
 1988: Suharto, President of Indonesia
 1988: Siti Hartinah, First Lady of Indonesia
 1990: Sirikit, Queen Consort of Thailand
 1990: Sirindhorn, Princess of Thailand
 1990: Lee Kuan Yew, Prime Minister of Singapore
 1996: Charles III, King of the United Kingdom, as Prince of Wales
 1997: Tun Dr. Mahathir Mohamad, Prime Minister of Malaysia
 2000: Princess Basma bint Talal of Jordan
 2001: Gloria Macapagal Arroyo, President of the Philippines
 2001: Prince Al Waleed bin Talal Al Saud
 2004: Silvia, Queen Consort of Sweden
 2004: Leonid Kuchma, President of Ukraine
 2006: Susilo Bambang Yudhoyono, President of Indonesia 
 2010: Tun Abdullah Ahmad Badawi, Prime Minister of Malaysia
 2010: Dato' Sri Haji Mohammad Najib Razak, Prime Minister of Malaysia
 2013: Willem-Alexander of the Netherlands, as Prince of Orange
 2013: Queen Máxima of the Netherlands, as Princess of Orange
 2014: Tun Pehin Sri Haji Abdul Taib Mahmud, Yang di-Pertua Negeri of Sarawak
 2015: Joko Widodo, President of Indonesia
 2019: Tunku Azizah Aminah, Raja Permaisuri Agong of Malaysia 
 2022: Lee Hsien Loong, Prime Minister of Singapore
 Hosni Mubarak, President of Egypt
 Raja Perempuan Tengku Anis

See also 
 Family Order of Seri Utama

References 

Orders, decorations, and medals of Brunei
Awards established in 1954
1954 establishments in Brunei